Loupian is a commune in the Hérault département in southern France.

Population

See also
 Loupian Roman villa
 Étang de Thau
Communes of the Hérault department

References

Communes of Hérault